Massimo Lombardo (born 9 January 1973 in Bellinzona) is a former Swiss international footballer. He is currently the academy manager of Swiss side Servette FC.

Senior career 
Lombardo has played over 300 games in the Swiss Super League. He started his career at Canton Ticino's team AC Bellinzona and moved to Grasshopper Club Zürich where he stayed for five seasons, his longest club cap. After a season at Serie B club AC Perugia, he moved back to Switzerland with stuns at FC Lugano, Lausanne-Sports and Servette FC. He then briefly played for FC Meyrin in 2004–05 Swiss Challenge League (Switzerland's second division) season before moving back to the Super League with Neuchâtel Xamax FC, but failed to avoid relegation to Challenge League.

In summer 2008, he joined FC Stade Nyonnais, newly promoted to Challenge League from 1. Liga, where he retired as a professional footballer in June 2009.

Managerial career 
In 2017, Lombardo was named assistant manager of Swiss side FC Basel.

He then joined Servette FC's academy as its manager in 2019, his current position.

References

External links
http://www.football.ch/sfl/1106/de/Kader.aspx?tId=0&pId=207394

Swiss men's footballers
Switzerland international footballers
Swiss expatriate footballers
AC Bellinzona players
Grasshopper Club Zürich players
A.C. Perugia Calcio players
FC Lugano players
FC Lausanne-Sport players
Servette FC players
Neuchâtel Xamax FCS players
Swiss Super League players
Serie B players
Expatriate footballers in Italy
Association football midfielders
People from Bellinzona
FC Stade Nyonnais players
1973 births
Living people
FC Meyrin players
Sportspeople from Ticino